Albert Boardman (4 December 1870 – 1943) was an English footballer who played in the Football League for Stoke.

Career
Boardman was born in Stoke-upon-Trent and was associated with Burslem Port Vale before joining Stoke in 1895. He was made as back-up goalkeeper to George Clawley and managed to make just four First Division appearances in two seasons. He later went on to play for non-league Dresden United.

Career statistics
Source:

References

1870 births
1943 deaths
Footballers from Stoke-on-Trent
English footballers
Association football goalkeepers
Port Vale F.C. players
Stoke City F.C. players
Dresden United F.C. players
English Football League players